WAGG (610 AM) is a commercial radio station licensed to Birmingham, Alabama.  It is owned by SummitMedia and broadcasts an urban gospel radio format that targets Birmingham's African-American community.  The studios and offices are in the Cahaba neighborhood in Southeast Birmingham, along with six other stations owned by SummitMedia.

The station was assigned the WAGG call sign by the Federal Communications Commission on January 15, 1999.  It broadcasts at 5,000 watts by day, reducing power to 610 watts at night to avoid interfering with other stations on AM 610.  It uses a non-directional antenna at all times.  The transmitter is off Avenue W, near Birmingham International Raceway.

History of AM 610
Some generations ago, the 610 AM frequency was home to Birmingham’s third oldest radio station.  That station began in 1926 as WKBC, broadcasting at 1310 AM.  The original owner of the station was a local furniture company.  In 1932, the station was sold to The Birmingham News, and the call sign was changed to WSGN.  That call sign stood for "South’s Greatest Newspaper," a tribute to The Chicago Tribune’s WGN, whose call sign stands for "World’s Greatest Newspaper."

Throughout the 1940s, WSGN was an affiliate of the NBC Blue Network, the forerunner of the current ABC Network.  Late in 1955, WSGN became the first station in Birmingham to adopt a Top 40 format.  In the early days it did battle with WYDE-AM 850 and WVOK-AM 690 in the current hits category.

Many legendary personalities worked at WSGN over the years.  Perhaps the most famous alumnus of WSGN was Rick Dees, who hosted morning drive-time from 1973-1974.

The dominance of WSGN was challenged in 1972 when longtime middle of the road station WBRC was sold.  Its call sign was changed to WERC, and for the first time since 1965, WSGN had a serious Top 40 challenger in the market.  For much of the mid-1970s, the battle between “The Big 610, WSGN” and “96-ERC” gave Birmingham and central Alabama listeners two strong choices for Top 40 music.

Prior to 1977, Top 40 could be heard on two FM stations: the automated 94.5 WAPI-FM and the daytime simulcasts of WERC on 106.9 WERC-FM.  In 1977, Birmingham got its first live, freestanding top-40 FM when WKXX (now WBPT) made its debut, replacing the WERC-FM call letters.  The ratings of WSGN began to decline, and by 1981, the station had moved away from its longtime Top 40 format and began targeting adult listeners. “The Big 610” gave way to “Music 610, The Station That Grew Up with You”, and the format became adult contemporary with a heavy mix of oldies.

As listeners switched to FM radio for current and recent hits, WSGN made a change.  In February 1984, the station became known as “Real Music 610”, playing adult standards and big band music.  This continued until April 26, 1985, when the owners sold the station and it became the AM simulcast partner of country music station WZZK-FM (104.7).  After 53 years, the call letters of WSGN were changed to WZZK-AM. This simulcast continued until 1998, when 610 AM returned to big band and adult standards with the new call sign WEZN.

WAGG history
WAGG was a Country station in Franklin, Tennessee that went on the air in 1953.  They were (and continues to be, with call letters WAKM) known for their hyper-local focus on community events, local news, high school sports and the Trade Time Live call-in swap show.  A scene from the movie Coal Miner's Daughter (film) was shot at WAGG because the equipment in the control room was authentic to the time period when Loretta Lynn was driving around promoting her singles to radio stations.

WAGG has been an Urban Gospel station since 1982.  Before then, the call letters were WENN.  Throughout the 1960s and into the 1970s, WENN was Birmingham's most popular station targeting African-American listeners, although it broadcast only during daylight hours with a relatively weak signal.  The growing popularity of its FM sister station led station ownership to adopt the gospel format, which proved to be successful.  By the end of the 1980s, WAGG was one of the highest-rated AM stations in Birmingham.

In 1998, Cox Radio, who already owned WZZK-FM, WODL-FM (now WBPT) and WEZN, bought WAGG, WBHJ and WBHK.  One year later, WEZN and WAGG swapped dial positions in order for WAGG to take advantage of the superior signal on 610 AM.

On July 20, 2012, Cox Radio, Inc. announced the sale of WAGG and 22 other stations to Summit Media LLC for $66.25 million. The sale was consummated on May 3, 2013.

On October 3, 2014, WAGG began simulcasting on FM translator W271BN (102.1 FM), after sister station WENN (1320 AM) temporarily went silent.

On March 14, 2016, WAGG switched FM translators from W271BN (which switched to a simulcast of soft adult contemporary-formatted WENN) to W261BX (100.1 FM).

References

External links
FCC History Cards for WAGG
WAGG official website

 WAGG 610 AM Live
 Radio/TV page of Birmingham Rewound

AGG
Radio stations established in 1926
1926 establishments in Alabama
Gospel radio stations in the United States
AGG